María Parra Luque (born 4 December 1997) is a professional golfer from Spain who played on the Ladies European Tour and the LPGA Tour already as a teenager. She won the 2015 European Ladies Amateur and rose to No. 2 in the World Amateur Golf Ranking.

Amateur career
Parra had a successful amateur career. In 2015, she won the European Ladies Amateur Championship in Austria and was runner-up at the Annika Invitational Europe in Sweden. She won the 2015 European Girls' Team Championship and was runner-up at the 2016 European Ladies' Team Championship, behind England. She represented Spain in the 2016 Junior Golf World Cup and the 2016 Espirito Santo Trophy, and represented Europe in the 2015 Junior Solheim Cup and the 2016 Patsy Hankins Trophy. She rose to No. 2 in the World Amateur Golf Ranking.

As the European Ladies Amateur title holder, Parra played in the 2016 Women's British Open, where she made the cut.

In 2016, while still an amateur, Parra played on the LET Access Series and won two tournaments, the PGA Halmstad Ladies Open at Haverdal in Sweden and the Drøbak Ladies Open in Norway. She finished at number 3 on the Order of Merit and earned full status for the 2017 Ladies European Tour. She also finished T13 at the Final Stage of the 2016 LPGA Qualifying Tournament to earn membership for the 2017 LPGA Tour.

Professional career
As a teenager on the 2017 LPGA Tour, Parra made three cuts in 18 starts, and on the 2017 Ladies European Tour she made three cuts in 8 starts. She joined the Symetra Tour in 2018, where she recorded three top-10 finishes including a victory at the IOA Invitational in 2019, to finish 17th in the ranking.

Parra made her U.S. Women's Open debut in 2021 after sharing medalist honors with compatriot Azahara Muñoz at the Banyan Cay Resort & Country Club qualifier. She made the cut and finished T35.

Amateur wins 
2013 North of England U16
2015 European Ladies Amateur Championship, Campeonato Absoluto C Valenciana

Source:

Professional wins (3)

Symetra Tour (1)

LET Access Series (2)

Results in LPGA majors
Results not in chronological order

CUT = missed the half-way cut
NT = no tournament
T = tied

Team appearances
Amateur
Junior Solheim Cup (representing Europe): 2015
European Girls' Team Championship (representing Spain): 2014, 2015 (winners)
European Ladies' Team Championship (representing Spain): 2016
Toyota Junior Golf World Cup (representing Spain): 2016
Espirito Santo Trophy (representing Spain): 2016
Patsy Hankins Trophy (representing Europe): 2016

Source:

References

External links

Spanish female golfers
Ladies European Tour golfers
LPGA Tour golfers
Sportspeople from Cádiz
1997 births
Living people
20th-century Spanish women
21st-century Spanish women